Naved Anjum (born July 27, 1963 in Lahore, Punjab) is a former Pakistani cricketer who played in 2 Tests and 13 ODIs from 1984 to 1992. After he left international cricket, he started a job with the Pakistan Cricket Board. He coached the United Arab Emirates at the 2001 ICC Trophy in Canada. He has also worked as the head coach of the Faisalabad regional team, the Faisalabad Wolves franchise, and Multan.

1963 births
Living people
Naved Anjum
Naved Anjum
Naved Anjum
Naved Anjum
Pakistani cricketers
Cricketers from Lahore
Lahore City cricketers
Lahore City Whites cricketers
Pakistan Railways cricketers
Coaches of the United Arab Emirates national cricket team
Pakistani cricket coaches